The Tonelli–Shanks algorithm (referred to by Shanks as the RESSOL algorithm) is used in modular arithmetic to solve for r in a congruence of the form r2 ≡ n (mod p), where p is a prime: that is, to find a square root of n modulo p.

Tonelli–Shanks cannot be used for composite moduli: finding square roots modulo composite numbers is a computational problem equivalent to integer factorization.

An equivalent, but slightly more redundant version of this algorithm was developed by
Alberto Tonelli
in 1891. The version discussed here was developed independently by Daniel Shanks in 1973, who explained:

My tardiness in learning of these historical references was because I had lent Volume 1 of Dickson's History to a friend and it was never returned.

According to Dickson, Tonelli's algorithm can take square roots of x modulo prime powers pλ apart from primes.

Core ideas

Given a non-zero  and an odd prime , Euler's criterion tells us that  has a square root (i.e.,  is a quadratic residue) if and only if:

.

In contrast, if a number  has no square root (is a non-residue), Euler's criterion tells us that:

.

It is not hard to find such , because half of the integers between 1 and  have this property.  So we assume that we have access to such a non-residue.

Note that if we try

,

then .

 ; and
  is a -th root of 1 (because ).

We can check whether  is a -th root of 1 by squaring it  times and check whether it is 1. But if it is not,  must be -1 (because squaring it gives 1, and there can only be two square roots 1 and -1 of 1 modulo ).

Then  must be multiplied by a factor  to keep . So we need to find a factor  so that  is a -th root of 1, or equivalently  is a -th root of -1.

The Euler's criterion applied to  shown above says that  is a -th root of -1. So by squaring  repeatedly, we have access to a sequence of -th root of -1. With a little bit of variable maintenance and trivial case compression, the algorithm below emerges naturally.

The algorithm 
Operations and comparisons on elements of the multiplicative group of integers modulo p  are implicitly mod p.

Inputs:
 p, a prime
 n, an element of  such that solutions to the congruence r2 = n exist; when this is so we say that n is a quadratic residue mod p.

Outputs:
 r in  such that r2 = n
Algorithm:
 By factoring out powers of 2, find Q and S such that  with Q odd
 Half of the elements in the set will be quadratic non-residues
 Candidates can be tested with Euler's criterion or by finding the Jacobi symbol
 Let

 Loop:
 If t = 0, return r = 0
 If t = 1, return r = R
 Otherwise, use repeated squaring to find the least i, 0 < i < M, such that 
 Let , and set

If the least i such that  is M, then no solution to the congruence exists, ie n is not a quadratic residue.

This is most useful when p ≡ 1 (mod 4).

For primes such that p ≡ 3 (mod 4), this problem has possible solutions . If these satisfy , they are the only solutions. If not, n is a quadratic non-residue, and there are no solutions.

Proof

We can show that at the start of each iteration of the loop the following  loop invariants hold:

 
 
 

Initially:

  (since z is a quadratic nonresidue, per Euler's criterion)
  (since n is a quadratic residue)
 

At each iteration, with M' , c' , t' , R'  the new values replacing M, c, t, R:

 
 
  since we have that  but  (i is the least value such that )
 
 

From  and the test against t = 1 at the start of the loop, we see that we will always find an i in 0 < i < M such that . M is strictly smaller on each iteration, and thus the algorithm is guaranteed to halt. When we hit the condition t = 1 and halt, the last loop invariant implies that R2 = n.

Order of t

We can alternately express the loop invariants using the order of the elements:

 
 
  as before

Each step of the algorithm moves t into a smaller subgroup by measuring the exact order of t and multiplying it by an element of the same order.

Example

  so , 
 Find a value for z:
 , so 2 is a quadratic residue by Euler's criterion.
 , so 3 is a quadratic nonresidue: set 
 Set

 Loop:
 First iteration:
 , so we're not finished
 ,  so 
 
 
 
 
 
 Second iteration:
 , so we're still not finished
  so 
 
 
 
 
 
 Third iteration:
 , and we are finished; return 

Indeed, 282 ≡ 5 (mod 41) and (−28)2 ≡ 132 ≡ 5 (mod 41). So the algorithm yields the two solutions to our congruence.

Speed of the algorithm
The Tonelli–Shanks algorithm requires (on average over all possible input (quadratic residues and quadratic nonresidues))

If the required quadratic nonresidue  is to be found by checking if a randomly taken number  is a quadratic nonresidue, it requires (on average)  computations of the Legendre symbol.

As written above, Cipolla's algorithm works better than Tonelli–Shanks if (and only if) .
Explicitly, one computes  such that  and then  satisfies  (note that  is a multiple of 2 because  is a quadratic residue).

The algorithm requires us to find a quadratic nonresidue . However, if the generalized Riemann hypothesis is true, there exists a quadratic nonresidue , making it possible to check every  up to that limit and find a suitable  within polynomial time. Keep in mind, however, that this is a worst-case scenario; in general,  is found in on average 2 trials as stated above.

Uses 
The Tonelli–Shanks algorithm can (naturally) be used for any process in which square roots modulo a prime are necessary. For example, it can be used for finding points on elliptic curves. It is also useful for the computations in the Rabin cryptosystem and in the sieving step of the quadratic sieve.

Generalizations 
Tonelli–Shanks can be generalized to any cyclic group (instead of ) and to kth roots for arbitrary integer k, in particular to taking the kth root of an element of a finite field.

If many square-roots must be done in the same cyclic group and S is not too large, a table of square-roots of the elements of 2-power order can be prepared in advance and the algorithm simplified and sped up as follows.
 Factor out powers of 2 from p − 1, defining Q and S as:  with Q odd.
 Let 
 Find  from the table such that  and set 
return R.

Tonelli's algorithm will work on mod p^k 

According to Dickson's "Theory of Numbers"

A. Tonelli gave an explicit formula for the roots of 

for  then
 where 

Noting that  and noting that  then

To take another example:  and

Dickson also attributes the following equation to Tonelli:

Using  and using the modulus of  the math follows:

First, find the modular square root mod  which can be done by the regular Tonelli algorithm:

 and thus 

And applying Tonelli's equation (see above):

Notes

References 
 
 Daniel Shanks. Five Number Theoretic Algorithms. Proceedings of the Second Manitoba Conference on Numerical Mathematics. Pp. 51–70. 1973.
 Alberto Tonelli, Bemerkung über die Auflösung quadratischer Congruenzen. Nachrichten von der Königlichen Gesellschaft der Wissenschaften und der Georg-Augusts-Universität zu Göttingen. Pp. 344–346. 1891. 
Gagan Tara Nanda - Mathematics 115: The RESSOL Algorithm 
Gonzalo Tornaria 

Modular arithmetic
Number theoretic algorithms
Articles containing proofs